Jacquelyn Kate "Jackie" Johnson (born September 8, 1984, in San Jose, California) is an American heptathlete. She is a four-time NCAA outdoor champion (2004, 2006–2008), and a three-time NCAA indoor champion (2006–2008) while competing for Arizona State University. She also set a personal best of 6,347 points by placing second at the 2008 U.S. Olympic Trials in Eugene, Oregon, which guaranteed her a qualifying place for the Olympics. Johnson was a member of the track and field team for the Arizona State Sun Devils, where she wa coached and trained by Dan O'Brien, gold medalist in the decathlon at the 1996 Summer Olympics in Atlanta, Georgia. In 2008, she won the Honda Sports Award as the nation's best female collegiate track and field athlete.

At the 2008 Summer Olympics in Beijing, Johnson competed as a member of the U.S. track and field team in the women's heptathlon, along with her fellow athletes Diana Pickler and Hyleas Fountain. Although she accomplished five events and reached into the higher position, Johnson, however, strained her left hamstring in the long jump, and was forced to withdraw from the competition because of the injury.

She competed for Yuma Union High School, where she won 14 Arizona state championships.

Personal bests

 All information taken from IAAF profile.

References

External links
 
 Profile – Arizona State Sun Devils
 Team USA Profile
 NBC 2008 Olympics profile

1984 births
Living people
American heptathletes
Olympic track and field athletes of the United States
Athletes (track and field) at the 2008 Summer Olympics
Arizona State Sun Devils women's track and field athletes
Sportspeople from Tempe, Arizona
Track and field athletes from San Jose, California